Pedro E. Colón Hernández (born 7 October 1965) is a Puerto Rican sailor. He competed in the Tornado event at the 2000 Summer Olympics.

Notes

References

External links
 
 

1965 births
Living people
Puerto Rican male sailors (sport)
Olympic sailors of Puerto Rico
Sailors at the 2000 Summer Olympics – Tornado
People from Río Piedras, Puerto Rico
20th-century Puerto Rican people